Simon Dewinter (20 September 1908 – 1 August 1972) was a Belgian boxer who competed in the 1936 Summer Olympics.

In 1936 he was eliminated in the second round of the lightweight class after losing his fight to Andrew Scrivani.

External links
 

1908 births
1972 deaths
Lightweight boxers
Olympic boxers of Belgium
Boxers at the 1936 Summer Olympics
Belgian male boxers